Ottavio Compagnoni (11 September 1926 – 29 September 2021) was an Italian cross-country skier who competed in the 1950s. Compagnoni finished 36th in the 18 km event at the 1952 Winter Olympics in Oslo. He was the brother of the skiers Aristide and Severino Compagnoni. He died in Moena in September 2021, at the age of 95.

Select results
 1950: 1st, Italian men's championships of cross-country skiing, 18 km
 1953: 2nd, Italian men's championships of cross-country skiing, 15 km
 1955: 2nd, Italian men's championships of cross-country skiing, 15 km
 1956: 2nd, Italian men's championships of cross-country skiing, 15 km
 1957: 3rd, Italian men's championships of cross-country skiing, 15 km
 1958: 2nd, Italian men's championships of cross-country skiing, 15 km
 1959: 2nd, Italian men's championships of cross-country skiing, 30 km

External links
18 km Olympic cross country results: 1948-52

References 

1926 births
2021 deaths
Italian male cross-country skiers
Olympic cross-country skiers of Italy
Cross-country skiers at the 1952 Winter Olympics
Cross-country skiers at the 1956 Winter Olympics
Cross-country skiers at the 1960 Winter Olympics
Sportspeople from the Province of Sondrio